Gerald Hugh Micklem  (14 August 1911 – 21 May 1988) was an English amateur golfer and administrator. He played in four Walker Cup matches between 1947 and 1955 and was non-playing captain in 1957 and 1959.

Micklem had limited success as a golfer before WWII, but gained an Oxford blue for golf and reached the final of the 1936 Addington Foursomes. He gained national attention when he reached the semi-final of the 1946 Amateur Championship and won the English Amateur. He played in the Walker Cup three times and won the English Amateur for a second time in 1953. He was also an active golf administrator and chairing various committees at The Royal and Ancient Golf Club of St Andrews (R&A). He was captain of the R&A in 1968 and received the Bob Jones Award in 1969 and the Walter Hagen Award in 1970. He was awarded a CBE in the 1969 New Year Honours.

Golf career
Micklem made little impact as a golfer before World War II, although he gained an Oxford blue for golf and, playing with Arthur Lacey, reached the final of the 1936 Addington Foursomes.

Micklem first came to national prominence when he reached the semi-final of the 1946 Amateur Championship before losing to Robert Sweeny Jr. The following year he won the English Amateur and was selected for the 1947 Walker Cup team. In 1948, partnered with Charlie Ward, he won the Daily Telegraph Foursomes Tournament. He played in the Walker Cup three more times, in 1949, 1953 and 1955, although he only won one of his Walker Cup matches, the foursomes in 1953. He won the English Amateur for a second time in 1953.

Golf administrator
Micklem was later actively involved as a golf administrator. He was non-playing captain of the Walker Cup team in 1957 and 1959, and chaired The Royal and Ancient Golf Club of St Andrews (R&A) rules of golf committee, selection committee, and championship committee and was captain of the R&A in 1968.

Awards
Micklem received the Bob Jones Award in 1969 and the Walter Hagen Award in 1970. He was awarded a CBE in the 1969 New Year Honours.

Amateur wins
1947 English Amateur
1948 Daily Telegraph Foursomes Tournament (with Charlie Ward)
1953 President's Putter, English Amateur
1955 Berkshire Trophy (tie with Kim Hall)

Team appearances
Walker Cup (representing andGreat Britain & Irel): 1947, 1949, 1953, 1955, 1957 (non-playing captain), 1959 (non-playing captain)
Commonwealth Tournament (representing Great Britain): 1954

References

English male golfers
Amateur golfers
People from Banstead
Officers of the Order of the British Empire
1911 births
1988 deaths